Escala is the self-titled debut album by British quartet Escala, who appeared on the ITV talent contest Britain's Got Talent. It was released on 25 May 2009 in the United Kingdom.

Release 
Escala revealed their debut album to an audience of about 400 media at Whitehall Palace, London on 23 September 2008. The album release was pushed back numerous times, to 1 June 2009. Then the album's release was brought forward by one week to 25 May 2009.

Recording 
The album was produced by Trevor Horn and recorded mainly at Sarm West London. Parts of "Kashmir" recorded at Sarm West Coast, Los Angeles, and the orchestra for the album was recorded at Angel Recording Studios, London.

Album analysis 
The album begins with "Requiem for a Tower", which is a re-orchestrated version of "Lux Aeterna" from the 2000 film, Requiem for a Dream. The piece will be familiar to viewers of Britain's Got Talent, as it is frequently used on the show. Another group's version of the piece is used by Sky Sports for their News, for whom Escala had been included as a part of an advertising campaign with the second track on the album, "Palladio", a version of "Palladio I, Allegretto" from Karl Jenkins' Diamond Music. It was performed by the group when they were on Britain's Got Talent. The third track is the Led Zeppelin cover, "Kashmir", and features guitarist Slash of hard rock bands Guns N' Roses and Velvet Revolver. In 2009 Escala returned to Britain's Got Talent to perform their version of "Kashmir" un-competitively on the second live semi-final.

The fourth track is "Finding Beauty", originally composed by Scot Craig Armstrong for his As If to Nothing album. The fifth track is a mellow cover of the popular Robert Miles dance track "Children". The sixth track is Wings cover, "Live and Let Die", it was performed by the group when they were on Britain's Got Talent. The seventh track is a cover of film composer Ennio Morricone's "Chi Mai". The eighth track is "Feeling Good", which was originally written by Anthony Newley and Leslie Bricusse for their 1965 musical The Roar of the Greasepaint—the Smell of the Crowd, but resembling the cover by the band Muse. The ninth track is a rendition of George Frideric Handel's "Sarabande". The tenth track is "Clubbed to Death", which was originally from Rob Dougan's debut album Furious Angels. The album ends with a traditional style version Samuel Barber's "Adagio for Strings".

The album features four songs which fellow British quartet Bond had recorded in a similar style: "Adagio for Strings", "Kashmir", "Palladio", and "Children" (which Bond performed under the title "Homecoming") on their Shine, Remixed and Classified albums.

Many Bond enthusiasts claimed Escala were mimicking the contemporary style of Bond which currently have substantial holding in the classical musical industry. Escala rebuked the claims. The Guardian newspaper in the UK stated, "a would be classical hit however the covers are endless [...] a lack of new original material".

According to media reports a cover of Snow Patrol's "Chasing Cars" was originally meant to appear on the album, but did not end up on the final release.

Track listing

Charts 
The album reached number 2 on the UK Albums Chart (31 May) and number 49 in the Republic of Ireland (28 May).

Weekly charts

Year-end charts

"Palladio" also made No. 39 in the UK Singles Chart (31 May), and No. 49 in Ireland (28 May).

Personnel 

 Trevor Horn – producer, guitar, programming, piano, bass
 Tim Weidner – recording engineer, mixer, programming
 Gary Langan – recording engineer
 Sam Farr – assistant engineer
 Graham Archer – assistant engineer, programming
 Smit – assistant engineer
 Mark Lewis – Pro Tools engineer
 Ash Soan – drums, percussion
 Pete Murray – programming, arranger, conductor, piano, Hammond organ, Wurlitzer
 Isobel Griffiths – orchestral contractor and fixer
 Perry Montague-Mason – orchestra leader
 Magnus Johnstone – assistant of string production
 Thomas Carroll – Cello
 Fiona Winning – Viola
 Robert Orton (Hit Mixer) – mixer
 Chris Elliot – arranger, piano, harpsichord
 Earl Harvin – drums
 Jason Perry – drum ideas

 Jamie Muhoberac – guitar samples
 Jenny O'Grady – choirmaster
 Metro Singers – choir
 Jeremy Wheatley – mixer
 Steve Robson – mixer
 Richard Edgeler – assistant mixer
 Simon Hale – arranger
 Steve MacMillan – recording engineer
 Slash – lead guitar
 John Shanks – guitar
 Jeff Rothschild – drums
 Tom Norris – violin
 Everton Nelson – orchestra leader
 Phil Palmer – guitar
 Steve Lipson – guitar
 Lol Creme – guitar
 Ian Thomas – drums

References

External links 
 
 

2009 debut albums
Escala (group) albums
Syco Music albums
Albums produced by Trevor Horn